Dubrajpur is a  village in the Sabang CD block in the Kharagpur subdivision of the Paschim Medinipur district in the state of West Bengal, India.

Geography

Location

Area overview
Kharagpur subdivision, shown partly in the map alongside, mostly has alluvial soils, except in two CD blocks in the west – Kharagpur I and Keshiary, which mostly have lateritic soils. Around 74% of the total cultivated area is cropped more than once. With a density of population of 787 per km2nearly half of the district's population resides in this subdivision. 14.33% of the population lives in urban areas and 86.67% lives in the rural areas.

Note: The map alongside presents some of the notable locations in the subdivision. All places marked in the map are linked in the larger full screen map.

Demographics
According to the 2011 Census of India, Dubrajpur had a total population of 4,578, of which 2,372 (52%) were males and 2,206 (48%) were females. There were 589 persons in the age range of 0–6 years. The total number of literate persons in Dubrajpur was 3,420 (85.74% of the population over 6 years).

Culture
David J. McCutchion mentions the early 19th century Lakshmi Janardana temple as a rich terracotta West Bengal Nava-ratna with ridged turrets measuring 21’ 2” square.

Dubrajpur picture gallery

References

External links

Villages in Paschim Medinipur district